Beach Spikers is a beach volleyball video game released in Japanese arcades in 2001. The game was developed in-house by Sega AM2 and published by Sega. A GameCube port, renamed Beach Spikers: Virtua Beach Volleyball, was released in 2002 for all regions.

Gameplay
Based on the sport of beach volleyball, the game revolves around two-on-two matches where a volleyball is hit back and forth over a net until one side allows the ball to touch the ground. Similar to Sega's Virtua sports games, most of the gameplay in Beach Spikers is based around the concept of "charging" the strength of moves, judged by how long the button is held prior to release at the point of which the move is executed. There is a button for setting (passing) and a button for rallying (sending the ball over the net) which, combined with how long the button is held to determine strength, is the basis for the way the entire game is played.

There are two modes to choose from: Arcade Mode and World Tour mode. Arcade mode is a basic progression through a series of AI opponents, and in the multiplayer portion of Arcade Mode, it is head-to-head matches for up to four human players. In World Tour mode, the player takes a user-created team through a tournament, earning points as they go that allow them to increase the stats of their players and unlock player customization items, including some based on other Sega titles like Fighting Vipers and Space Channel 5. The player has the option to customize their own characters or choose a team from a specific country, such as the United States, Jamaica, Italy, and France, to name a few.

Reception

The GameCube version received "generally favorable reviews" according to the review aggregation website Metacritic. In Japan, Famitsu gave it a score of 30 out of 40.

Also in Japan, Game Machine listed the arcade version in their September 1, 2001 issue as the fifth most-successful arcade game of the year.

The same GameCube version was nominated for "Best Game No One Played on GameCube" and "Best Alternative Sports Game on GameCube" at GameSpots Best and Worst of 2002 Awards, both of which went to Sega Soccer Slam and  Tony Hawk's Pro Skater 4, respectively.

See also
Dead or Alive Xtreme Beach Volleyball
Outlaw Volleyball 
Summer Heat Beach Volleyball

References

External links
 (arcade)
 (GameCube)

2001 video games
Arcade video games
Beach volleyball video games
GameCube games
Sega-AM2 games
Sega arcade games
Multiplayer and single-player video games
Video games developed in Japan
Video games featuring female protagonists